The Sovereign Military and Hospitaller Order of St. John of Jerusalem, Oecumenical Knights of Malta is one of the 26 unrecognised (self-styled) orders of St. John active in 2010.  The order is not affiliated with the genuine Sovereign Military Hospitaller Order of Saint John of Jerusalem of Rhodes and of Malta, Venerable Order of St John and Order of Saint John (Bailiwick of Brandenburg), which are, respectively, a Roman Catholic, Anglican and Reformed-Lutheran order of Knights-Hospitallers; neither of the genuine Orders of Saint John is fully oecumenical.  Their conjoint Committee on Orders of Saint John considers the so-called "Sovereign Military and Hospitaller Order of Saint John of Jerusalem, Oecumenical Knights of Malta" to be a "false" order.

The "Sovereign Military and Hospitaller Order of St. John of Jerusalem, Oecumenial Knights of Malta" is linked to the Glorus Foundation, a so-called charitable trust and shareholder in the Euro-America Finance Holding International - Cayman Islands - Panama.  In Germany the same organisation is called the "Kreuz des Südens" or "Cross of the South".

According to the Sovereign Military Order of Malta, the self-styled order's name uses the reputation and the trust that are given to the genuine Orders of Saint John. On the other hand, Prince Robert Michael Nicholas George Bassaraba von Brancovan, a leader in the Sovereign Military and Hospitaller Order of Saint John of Jerusalem, Oecumenical Knights of Malta, claimed that Pope Paul VI wished the Order "all the luck in the world" and asserted that "We area legal entity and have the same rights they do, except we are inane polite. Our members —who are Nobel prize winners, United States generals, foreign ambassadors and Catholic clergymen—are all well aware that they are not in St. Patrick's and feel that there's no reason to have Rome dictate to us."

References

External links
The Sovereign Order of the Ecumenical Knights of Malta, O.S.J.

Self-styled orders